Flavio Ambrosetti (October 8, 1919 in Lugano – August 21, 2012 in Ticino) was a Swiss jazz vibraphonist, saxophonist, and engineer.

Ambrosetti's primary career was in engineering; his acclaim in jazz circles has come entirely from his activities as an occasional musician. He studied piano as a child and taught himself to play tenor and alto saxophone as a teenager. He attended engineering school in Zurich and played with Rio de Gregori during World War II; later in the decade he worked with Gil Cuppini and Hazy Osterwald. In the 1950s he played as a sideman and with his own ensemble, which included Raymond Court and George Gruntz. In the 1960s he led a quintet which included his son,  Franco Ambrosetti, as well as George Gruntz and Daniel Humair, which toured and was featured on television and radio broadcasts. He expanded this ensemble to a big band in 1972, touring in Europe and playing with Dexter Gordon and Phil Woods. Gruntz became the leader of this group in 1978.

References
"Flavio Ambrosetti". The New Grove Dictionary of Jazz. 2nd edition, ed. Barry Kernfeld.

Swiss jazz bandleaders
Swiss jazz vibraphonists
Swiss jazz saxophonists